Mario Marois (born December 15, 1957) is a Canadian former ice hockey defenceman.

Biography
As a youth, Marois played in the 1968, 1969 and 1970 Quebec International Pee-Wee Hockey Tournaments with a minor ice hockey team from L'Ancienne-Lorette, Quebec.

Marois started his National Hockey League career with the New York Rangers in 1978. He also played for the Vancouver Canucks before landing with the Quebec Nordiques. While with the Quebec Nordiques, Marois served as team captain for three years before being traded to the Winnipeg Jets.

He left the NHL after the 1992 season. He served one season as a player-assistant coach of the Hamilton Canucks of the AHL in 1992–93 before retiring as a player.

He worked as a scout with the Carolina Hurricanes and Vancouver Canucks before later becoming an amateur scout with the Detroit Red Wings. He was inducted into the QMJHL Hall of Fame in 2016.

Career statistics

Regular season and playoffs

International

References

External links

1957 births
Living people
Canadian ice hockey defencemen
Carolina Hurricanes scouts
Detroit Red Wings scouts
Hamilton Canucks players
Ice hockey people from Quebec
National Hockey League broadcasters
New Haven Nighthawks players
New York Rangers draft picks
New York Rangers players
People from Capitale-Nationale
Quebec Nordiques announcers
Quebec Nordiques players
Quebec Remparts players
St. Louis Blues players
Vancouver Canucks players
Vancouver Canucks scouts
Winnipeg Jets (1979–1996) players